Christina Thalassinidou (born 31 July 1970) is a Soviet and later Greek former synchronized swimmer who competed in the 1988, 1992, 2000 and .

References

External links
 
Profile at Infosport.ru 

1970 births
Living people
Sportspeople from Tbilisi
Soviet emigrants to Greece
Naturalized citizens of Greece
Soviet synchronized swimmers
Greek synchronized swimmers
Olympic synchronized swimmers of the Soviet Union
Olympic synchronized swimmers of Greece
Synchronized swimmers at the 1988 Summer Olympics
Synchronized swimmers at the 1992 Summer Olympics
Synchronized swimmers at the 2000 Summer Olympics
Synchronized swimmers at the 2004 Summer Olympics